The Pleiku Stadium is a multi-use stadium in Pleiku, Vietnam.  It is currently used mostly for football matches and is the home stadium of Hoang Anh Gia Lai, or HAGL (also a company). The stadium holds 13,000 people.

References

Pleiku
Football venues in Vietnam
Buildings and structures in Gia Lai province